The North Avenue Commercial District is a  historic district located in the city of Plainfield in Union County, New Jersey. It was added to the National Register of Historic Places on March 29, 1984 for its significance in architecture, commerce, religion, and transportation. The district, which runs along North Avenue, from Watchung Avenue on the east, to Park Avenue on the west, includes 33 contributing buildings.

History and description
Most of the buildings in the district were built in the 50 years between 1875 and 1925. They are a collection of masonry Victorian commercial buildings that developed around the station of the Central Railroad of New Jersey, which arrived in 1840. The district also includes the Rahway and Plainfield Friends Meeting House, which was built in 1788.

The Chotola Building at 171–175 North Avenue was built using brick and terra cotta in 1890. It features an ornamental facade with a half round Richardsonian arch on the third floor and stone half figures on either side of the doorway.

See also
National Register of Historic Places listings in Union County, New Jersey
List of the oldest buildings in New Jersey

References

External links
 

Plainfield, New Jersey	
National Register of Historic Places in Union County, New Jersey
Historic districts on the National Register of Historic Places in New Jersey
Historic districts in Union County, New Jersey
New Jersey Register of Historic Places